Joan Plaza Durán (born 26 December 1963) is a Spanish professional basketball coach, who was most recently worked for Coosur Real Betis of the Liga ACB. He trained Real Madrid Baloncesto for three years, winning one Liga ACB championship, and an ULEB Cup (now called EuroCup) title. In 2009, after a bad season, he was replaced in Real Madrid, by CSKA Moscow's successful coach, Ettore Messina.

Coaching career
Joan Plaza began his career with the basketball school founded by him and his brothers, EB Betsaida. At the same time, he worked for the women's team EB Santísima Trinitat, as well as the small club CB Sant Adriá. In 1995, he at last became a new coach of Joventut de Badalona, where he worked as the youth and assistant trainer, until 2004. His greatest achievement was in the 2000–01 season, when his team won the Spanish Under-20 championship.

In the summer of 2004, following the wishes of the new coach Božidar Maljković, Plaza switched to Real Madrid. When the Serbian coach left after a disappointing season, Plaza assumed the position of head coach.

In the following season, Real Madrid won their first thirteen Liga ACB games in a row, giving Plaza a new record for a coach in his first season. The team also won the European-wide ULEB Cup (now called EuroCup) competition, and he was named the AEEB Coach of the Year.

In the 2007–08 season, Real Madrid signed Greek star Lazaros Papadopoulos, who failed to perform well during the whole season. The team lost in the first round of the Liga ACB playoffs, and didn't reach the EuroLeague Final Four for the 12th consecutive year. Madrid's 2008–09 season's team was reformed, but failed once again to reach the EuroLeague Final Four, or to perform well in the Spanish Cup. After losing in the Liga ACB playoffs' second round to TAU Cerámica, Plaza was sacked, and he was replaced by the 4 time EuroLeague champion head coach, Ettore Messina, on June 18. The following day, he signed a one-year contract with the Spanish club Cajasol Sevilla.

In the 2016–17 season Plaza won his second EuroCup title with Unicaja after beating Valencia BC in the Finals. Plaza became the third coach to have won multiple EuroCup titles.

On November 30, 2020, he has signed 1+1 year contract with Coosur Real Betis of the Liga ACB.

Coaching record

EuroLeague

|- 
| align="left"|Real Madrid
| align="left"|2007–08
| 20 || 14 || 6 ||  || align="center"|Eliminated in Top 16 stage
|- 
| align="left"|Real Madrid
| align="left"|2008–09
| 20 || 12 || 8 ||  || align="center"|Eliminated in quarterfinals
|- 
| align="left"|Žalgiris
| align="left"|2012–13
| 24 || 14 || 10 ||  || align="center"|Eliminated in Top 16 stage
|- 
| align="left"|Unicaja
| align="left"|2013–14
| 24 || 11 || 13 ||  || align="center"|Eliminated in Top 16 stage
|- 
| align="left"|Unicaja
| align="left"|2014–15
| 24 || 8 || 16 ||  || align="center"|Eliminated in Top 16 stage
|- 
| align="left"|Unicaja
| align="left"|2015–16
| 24 || 11 || 13 ||  || align="center"|Eliminated in Top 16 stage
|- 
| align="left"|Unicaja
| align="left"|2017–18
| 30 || 13 || 17 ||  || align="center"|Eliminated in regular season
|-class="sortbottom"
| align="center" colspan=2|Career||166||83||83||||

Honours
Unicaja
EuroCup (1): 2016–17
Real Madrid
 ULEB Cup (1): 2006–07
 Liga ACB (1): 2006–07
Žalgiris Kaunas
 Lithuanian Supercup (1): 2012
 Lietuvos krepšinio lyga (1) : 2013
Individual
 AEEB Spanish Coach of the Year: 2007
 ACB Best Coach: 2008

References

External links
 Joan Plaza at acb.com 
 Joan Plaza at euroleague.net

Living people
1963 births
Baloncesto Málaga coaches
BC Žalgiris coaches
BC Zenit Saint Petersburg coaches
Catalan basketball coaches
Joventut Badalona coaches
Liga ACB head coaches
Real Madrid basketball coaches
Spanish basketball coaches